The 1960 European Rowing Championships were rowing championships held on the Welsh Harp Reservoir in the London suburb of Willesden in England. This edition of the European Rowing Championships was for women only and was held from 12 to 14 August. Twelve countries contested five boat classes (W1x, W2x, W4x+, W4+, W8+). Men would compete later that month in Italy for the 1960 Summer Olympics.

German participation
Neither FISA, the International Rowing Federation, nor the International Olympic Committee recognised East Germany as a country and insisted on one German team per boat class. Further negotiations in Hanover during April were difficult, with West German representatives rejecting suggestions by East German delegates. At further negotiations in Berlin in Mai, it was agreed that qualification races for the European Championships and the Olympic Games would be dealt with separately. In the end, the West German view of having a single regatta decide the representation prevailed, and Olympic qualifications were decided on 6 August on the Wedau Regatta Course in Duisburg. The qualifications for the European Championships were held at the same weekend, but it is not clear from media reporting whether this happened at the same venue. With East German women dominant in rowing, the West Germans contested the double scull boat class only, but that race was won by East Germany. Thus, all German representatives in London were from East Germany.

Medal summary – women's events

Medals table

References

European Rowing Championships
European Rowing Championships
Rowing
Rowing
European Rowing Championships
European Rowing Championships
Rowing
Sports competitions in London